The Lithuanian A Lyga 1990 was the first season of top-tier football in Lithuania since it broke off from the Soviet Union. 

The competition consisted of two stages: the first stage with double round robin tournaments (this league as well as Lithuanian teams of the 1990 Baltic League) and second stage championship title playoffs among the best Lithuanian teams from both leagues. The league competitions started on 7 April 1990 and ended on 9 October 1994. The championship title playoffs kicked off on 20 October with quarter-finals and ended with a final match on 4 November 1990.

Final table

Play-offs for the football champion title of Lithuania
Play-offs were organized between the Lithuanian clubs of all-Union Soviet professional competitions and competitions of the Lithuanian SSR.
 1990 Baltic League qualifiers: 1. Žalgiris Vilnius, 2. Sirijus Klaipėda, 3. Ekranas Panevėžys, 5. Jovaras Mažeikiai

See also
1990 in Lithuanian football

References

LFF Lyga seasons
1990 in Lithuanian football
Lith
Lith